"Little Boy Sad" is a song written by Wayne Walker and performed by Johnny Burnette. The song reached #12 on the UK Singles Chart and #17 on the Billboard Hot 100 in 1961. The song appeared on his 1961 album, Johnny Burnette Sings.

The song was produced by Snuff Garrett.

Chart history

Weekly charts
Johnny Burnette

Bill Phillips

Other versions
Paul Petersen released a version of the song as the B-side to his hit single, "My Dad" in 1962.  It was featured on his 1962 album, Lollipops and Roses.
M.P.D. Limited released a version as a single in Australia in 1965.  It reached the Top 10 across Australia.
The Gants released a version as a single in 1966.
Herman's Hermits released a version on their 1966 album, Both Sides of Herman's Hermits.
Bill Phillips released a version as a single in 1969.  It reached #10 on the country chart.

References

1961 songs
1961 singles
1962 singles
1965 singles
1966 singles
1969 singles
Johnny Burnette songs
Herman's Hermits songs
Song recordings produced by Snuff Garrett
Liberty Records singles
Decca Records singles
Bill Phillips (singer) songs
Songs written by Wayne Walker (songwriter)